The 2013–14 Portland Pilots men's basketball team represented the University of Portland during the 2013–14 NCAA Division I men's basketball season. The Pilots, led by eighth-year head coach Eric Reveno, played their home games at the Chiles Center and were members of the West Coast Conference. They finished the season 15–16, 7–11 in WCC play to finish in a tie for sixth place. They lost in the first round of the West Coast Conference tournament to Loyola Marymount.

Before the season

Departures

Recruitment
The Pilots had 3 men commit with Letters of Intent.  A fourth man, Volodymyr Gerun, transferred to Portland and will be eligible immediately.

Roster

Schedule and results
The five game European tour was broadcast on Stretch Internet with Associate Athletic Director Jason Brough acting as the broadcaster. 

|-
!colspan=9 style="background:#461D7C; color:#FFFFFF;"| Exhibition

|-
!colspan=9 style="background:#461D7C; color:#FFFFFF;"| Non-conference regular season

|-
!colspan=9 style="background:#461D7C; color:#FFFFFF;"| WCC regular season

|-
!colspan=9 style="background:#461D7C;"| 2014 WCC tournament

Source: Schedule

Game summaries

Exhibition: Concordia Irvine

UC Davis
Series History: Portland leads series 3-0

Oregon State
Series History: Oregon State leads series 51-16
Broadcasters: Brian Webber and Lamar Hurd

Coaches vs. Cancer: #1 Michigan State
Series History: Michigan State leads series 1-0
Broadcasters: Eric Collins and Jim Jackson

Coaches vs. Cancer: Idaho
Series History: Idaho leads series 13-11

Coaches vs. Cancer:Columbia
Series History: Columbia leads 1-0

Coaches vs. Cancer: North Texas
Series History: First Meeting

San Jose State
Series History: San Jose State leads 1-1

Southern Utah
Series History: Series even 1-1

Portland State
Series History: Portland leads 33-17

Montana State
Series History: Portland leads series 13-10

South Point Holiday Hoops: Bradley
Series History: Portland leads 2-1

South Point Holiday Hoops: Princeton
Series History: First Meeting

San Francisco
Series History: San Francisco leads 51-26
Broadcasters: Tom Glasgow & Joe Cravens

Santa Clara
Series History: Santa Clara leads 57-30
Broadcasters: Roxy Bernstein & Kris Johnson

Pacific
Series History: Pacific leads 20-8
Broadcasters: Tom Glasgow & Bill Krueger

Saint Mary's
Series History: Saint Mary's leads 56-29
Broadcasters: Tom Glasgow & Bill Krueger

Gonzaga
Series History: Gonzaga leads series 91-65
Broadcasters: Roxy Bernstein & Jarron Collins

Loyola Marymount
Series History: Loyola Marymount leads 47-42
Broadcasters: Justin Alderson & Kris Johnson

Pepperdine
Series History: Portland leads series 56-33
Broadcasters: Al Epstein

BYU
Series History: BYU leads 9-0
Broadcasters: Tom Glasgow & Bill Krueger

References

Portland
Portland Pilots men's basketball seasons
Port
Port